Govardhan also called Giriraj, is a key pilgrimage centre in India and a municipal town; a nagar panchayat; seat of a MLA Member of Legislative Assembly of Uttar Pradesh; a Tehsil, in Mathura district in the India in state of Uttar Pradesh. About 23 kilometres from Mathura, the town is on the road link between Mathura and Deeg.

Geography
It has an average elevation of 179 metres (587 feet). Govardhana has been made Tehsil in Mathura District by the Uttar Pradesh government.

Demographics
In the 2011 Indian Census, Govardhana had a population of 22,576. Males constituted 55% of the population and females 45%. Govardhana has an average literacy rate of 62%, higher than the national average of 59.5%: male literacy is 70%, and female literacy is 52%. In Govardhana, 17% of the population is under 6 years of age.

Govardhan Hill

Pilgrimage
Each year Hindus and other people make pilgrimage to Govardhan, and its sacred Govardhan Hill, from different places in India and other parts of the world. They circumambulate Govardhan and offer their obeisances to Krishna and Radha, key deities in Hinduism. One of the main festivals celebrated at Govardhan is Govardhan Puja, that commemorates the lifting of Govardhan Hill (Giriraj Parvat) to protect the villagers of Braj from the flood caused by the Lord of thunder and rain, Indra. One of the most important day celebrated at Govardhan is Guru Poornima (also called "Mudia Poono"). Following the festival of lights, or Diwali, the previous day, devotees come to Govardhan for parikrama.

Historic religious sites
Sites on the hill include Kusum Sarovar, Haridev Temple, and other temples like Daan-Ghati Temple and Mukharbind Temple. The town is also famous for its 21 kilometers long Parikrama of the famous Govardhan Hill.

Mansi Ganga sacred lake

The town also houses Mansi Ganga, a close-ended lake. On the banks of this sacred lake, there are quite a few temples, prominent among them the Mukharbind temple.

Kusum sarovar and Samadhi of Jat ruler Maharaja Suraj Mal

On the Govardhan Parikrama path on the western bank of 130 sqm sacred artificial lake Kusum Sarovar (Kusum kund) there are three Chhatris housing the samadhis of Jat ruler Maharaja Suraj Mal (r. 1755 – 25 December 1763) and 2 his wives, all of these memorials were built by his son and successor Maharaja Jawahar Singh. The architecture and carving is in the pierced stone style and the ceiling of cenotaphs are adorned with the beautiful painting of life of lord Krishna and Maharajs Suraj Mal's court. Most imposing chattri is of Mahara Suraj Mal, flanked on either side by two smaller chattris of his two wives, "Maharani Hansiya" and "Maharani Kishori". Maharaj Suraj Mal is well known for capturing Red Fort in 1754 CE after defetaing the forces of Mughal king Ahmad Shah Bahadur.

Transportation
There are also tourist buses and a single line electric train for the journey from Mathura.

Gallery

See also
 Govardhana sila

References

External links

 Goverdhan Parikrama highlights

Cities and towns in Mathura district
Hindu holy cities